Natalie Gioia is an electronic music vocalist and songwriter, based in Kyiv, Ukraine. At the age of 16, Natalie decided to try herself as a vocalist. Later, when she reached 20, she was invited as a solo singer to Japan's tour with show ballet Bourgeois. Tunisia was the next step in her career. Touring in the African country, Natalie met  Italian impresario Flavio Demichelis, who invited her to collaborate in Italy. In the 2006 she signed contract and later released a new song Che donna vorei. It was a success in the eyes of critics. In 2009 Natalie came to Ukraine, where she met her love. This fact influenced Natalie's music tastes and she tried to sing on the EDM tracks. After her first EDM collaboration was released through Angelu music label, Natalie immediately caught the attention of producers like EDU and Tucandeo, which developed her professionalism in this genre of music. Understanding this song are not the ones, which could be the center of her music career, she started to collaborate with Alex M.O.R.P.H. As the result, track Dreams was released on the A State of Trance (Armada) label. Dreams of Alex and Natalie reached TOP5 tracks (Beatport.com Trance Chart) and was included to the Universal Religion Chapter 7 (by Armin van Buuren).

Discography

Singles

Awards and nominations
 No. 6 A State of Trance, Tune of the Year 2021 (by Armin van Buuren) with the track "Shine"
 No. 22 Future Sound Of Egypt, Wonder of the Year 2019 (by Aly & Fila) with the track "Save The World"
 No. 27 A State of Trance, Tune of the Year 2019 (by Armin van Buuren) with the track "One Million Seconds"
 No. 18 A State of Trance, Tune of the Year 2018 (by Armin van Buuren) with the track "For The One You Love"
 No. 2 in TOP100 2015 by KISS FM - the biggest FM dance radio network in Europe, with the track "Addicted" 
 No. 3 A State of Trance, Tune of the Year 2014 (by Armin van Buuren) with the track "The Reason"
 No. 21 A State of Trance, Tune of the Year 2014 (by Armin van Buuren) with the track "My Heaven"
 No. 7 A State of Trance, Tune of the Year 2013 (by Armin van Buuren) with the track "Dreams"

References

External links
 Natalie Gioia on Instagram
 Natalie Gioia on Facebook 
 Natalie Gioia on Soundcloud 
 Natalie Gioia on Twitter
 Natalie Gioia on YouTube

21st-century Ukrainian women singers
Living people
Trance singers
Ukrainian pop singers
English-language singers from Ukraine
Ukrainian singer-songwriters
Ukrainian-language singers
Russian-language singers
Armada Music artists
Year of birth missing (living people)